The Voisin Laboratoire was a racing car designed by Gabriel Voisin, who made airplanes before the First World War.

Voisin Laboratoire is highlighted in various magazines and news outlets including French magazines Causeur and Challenges. In 1995, The Washington Post highlighted Voisin Laboratoire as "...the Voisin Laboratoire of 1923 has the excited but dated feel of a Futurist manifesto".

See also
 Voisin Type C6
 Voisin (aircraft)
 Avions Voisin

References 
Car brands
French brands
Defunct motor vehicle manufacturers of France
Cars powered by Knight engines
Luxury motor vehicle manufacturers
Motor vehicle manufacturers of France
Car manufacturers of France